Roger Royce Ring (born December 21, 1980) is an American former professional baseball pitcher and coach. He played in Major League Baseball (MLB) for the New York Mets, San Diego Padres, Atlanta Braves and New York Yankees.

Early life
Ring was born in La Mesa, California. He graduated from Monte Vista High School (Spring Valley, California) and attended San Diego State University where he was a star closer.

Professional career

Chicago White Sox
He was selected by the Chicago White Sox as the 18th overall pick in the first round of the 2002 Major League Baseball draft.

New York Mets

In 2003, Ring was acquired by the Mets with Edwin Almonte and Andrew Salvo in the trade that sent Roberto Alomar and cash to the White Sox. Ring's performance suffered in the 2004 season and, for a time, he was no longer considered a top prospect. This was evidenced by the fact that the Mets left him unprotected in the Rule 5 draft. Part of Ring's problem was his nonchalant attitude about physical fitness, as he gained body fat during his career downturn.

However, after a surprisingly strong spring training and minor league showing in 2005, Ring was added to the Mets' Major League roster and made his Major League debut on April 29 against the Washington Nationals. He posted a disappointing 5.06 ERA before being demoted to the minor leagues later in the season. Ring changed his pitching motion and received better results. He was recalled to the big leagues on August 2, 2006, but was sent back to Triple-A Norfolk three weeks later to make room on the 25-man roster for newly acquired Shawn Green.

San Diego Padres
On November 15, 2006, Ring was traded along with Heath Bell to the San Diego Padres for outfielder Ben Johnson and reliever Jon Adkins. Ring pitched in 15 games for the Padres.

Atlanta Braves

On July 31, 2007, Ring was traded to the Atlanta Braves for Wilfredo Ledezma and pitching prospect Will Startup, and then was optioned to the Triple-A Richmond Braves. He was called up when the rosters expanded on September 1. In 2008, Ring had an 8.46 ERA and was designated for assignment in August 2008.  He cleared waivers and was assigned to Triple-A Richmond.  He became a free agent at the end of the season.

St. Louis Cardinals
On January 5, 2009, Ring signed a one-year deal with the St. Louis Cardinals. However, he was placed on outright waivers on March 25, and accepted a Triple-A assignment to the Memphis Redbirds.

New York Yankees
On January 12, 2010, Ring signed a minor league contract with an invite to spring training with the New York Yankees. Although he impressed the Yankees in spring training, he was optioned to the Triple-A Scranton/Wilkes-Barre Yankees.

Following the completion of the Triple-A season, the Yankees purchased Ring's contract and promoted him to the major leagues.

He pitched in 5 games for the Yankees, allowing 4 runs in less than 3 innings.

Seattle Mariners
On December 14, 2010, Ring signed a minor league contract for the 2011 season with the Seattle Mariners with an invitation to spring training. However, he did not make the Mariners out of spring training, and he was sent to the minors on March 27. He opted out of his contract on July 3 after posting an ERA of 6.08 in 27 games.

Boston Red Sox
Ring signed a minor league contract with the Boston Red Sox on July 20, 2011. Ring pitched in just 9 games for Pawtucket.

Colorado Rockies
Ring signed a minor league deal with the Colorado Rockies on March 5, 2012.

Long Island Ducks
On May 26, 2013, Ring signed a contract with the Long Island Ducks of the Atlantic League of Professional Baseball (ALPB).

Coaching career

In May 2014 it was announced that Ring was retiring as a player to become the pitching coach for the Gulf Coast Mets, a rookie level minor league team in the New York Mets organization.  Ring began serving as the pitching coach for the Short Season A Brooklyn Cyclones in 2017 and 2018. He was promoted to the Low-A Columbia Fireflies for 2019 and was promoted to the High-A St. Lucie Mets for 2020. After the MiLB realignment of 2021, Ring was assigned back to the Brooklyn Cyclones, who are now the High-A Affiliate of the New York Mets.

On January 16, 2022, the Lotte Giants of the KBO League hired Ring to serve as the team's pitching coordinator.

References

External links

1980 births
Living people
Arizona League White Sox players
Atlanta Braves players
Baseball coaches from California
Baseball players from California
Birmingham Barons players
Binghamton Mets players
Bravos de Margarita players
American expatriate baseball players in Venezuela
Brooklyn Cyclones coaches
Colorado Springs Sky Sox players
Gulf Coast Red Sox players
Long Island Ducks players
Major League Baseball pitchers
Memphis Redbirds players
New York Mets players
New York Yankees players
Norfolk Tides players
Pawtucket Red Sox players
People from La Mesa, California
Peoria Saguaros players
Portland Beavers players
Richmond Braves players
San Diego Padres players
San Diego State Aztecs baseball players
Scranton/Wilkes-Barre Yankees players
Tacoma Rainiers players
Anchorage Glacier Pilots players
Tulsa Drillers players
Winston-Salem Warthogs players